Eleotris sandwicensis, the Sandwich Island sleeper, Hawaiian sleeper or oopu, is a species of fish in the family Eleotridae endemic to the Hawaiian Islands, where it can be found in marine, fresh, and brackish waters around the coast. Due to this capability of migrating between different marine environments, they are amphidromous. It is locally important to commercial fisheries and is also used as bait by fishermen after larger fishes. In the Hawaiian language, the fish is also known as oopu, oau, owau, and hiu kole.

The distribution of E. sandwicensis is limited as this species does not have the ability to travel upstream of steep waterfalls.  This is due to their lack of pelvic fins.

References

External links
 Photograph

sandwicensis
Freshwater fish of Hawaii
Endemic fauna of Hawaii
Fish described in 1875
Taxonomy articles created by Polbot